Charles Ainsworth may refer to:

 Charles Ainsworth (politician) (1874–1956), British businessman and politician
 Charles Ainsworth (footballer) (1885–1955), English footballer